Pulaski County Courthouse is a historic courthouse located at Winamac, Pulaski County, Indiana. It was built in 1894–1895, and is a massive three-story, nearly square, Romanesque Revival style limestone building.  It measures 88 feet by 90 feet and is topped by a slate hipped roof.  The building features a 106 feet tall square clock tower topped by a pyramidal roof.  Located on the courthouse lawn are the contributing drinking fountain and steps (c. 1940); monument to World War I, World War II, and Korean War veterans (1949); and a concrete obelisk.

It was listed on the National Register of Historic Places in 2007.

References

Clock towers in Indiana
County courthouses in Indiana
Courthouses on the National Register of Historic Places in Indiana
Romanesque Revival architecture in Indiana
Government buildings completed in 1895
Buildings and structures in Pulaski County, Indiana
National Register of Historic Places in Pulaski County, Indiana